Thani Oruvan is a 2015 Indian Tamil-language action thriller film directed by Mohan Raja, who also co-wrote the screenplay and dialogues with the duo Subha. The film features Jayam Ravi, Arvind Swami and Nayanthara in the lead roles.  Thambi Ramaiah, Ganesh Venkatraman, Mugdha Godse and Nassar play supporting roles. The film's story focuses on Mithran (Ravi), an IPS officer, who learns of the plans of scientist and businessman Siddharth Abhimanyu (Swami) to sabotage a deal to make generic medicines available at low cost for poor people. Siddharth succeeds in his plan and begins indulging in a game of cat and mouse with Mithran. The rest of the story revolves around how Mithran overcomes the obstacles set by Siddharth. Produced by Kalpathi S. Aghoram, Kalpathi S. Ganesh and Kalpathi S. Suresh under their company AGS Entertainment, the film's soundtrack and score were composed by Hiphop Tamizha. Ramji and Gopi Krishna handled the cinematography and editing respectively.

Made on a budget of ₹200 million, Thani Oruvan was released on 28 August 2015 and received positive reviews. It was commercially successful, grossing ₹1.05 billion worldwide. The film won 15 awards from 37 nominations; its direction, story, screenplay, performances of the cast members and music have received the most attention from award groups.

At the 63rd Filmfare Awards South, Thani Oruvan was nominated in six categories, including Best Film (Aghoram, Ganesh and Suresh), Best Director (Raja) and Best Actor (Ravi); it won for Best Director, Best Supporting Actor (Swami) and Critics Award for Best Actor (Ravi). The film also received six nominations at the 1st IIFA Utsavam including Best Performance in a Lead Role (Female) (Nayanthara) and Best Performance in a Comic Role (Ramaiah). It won three, Best Direction, Best Performance in a Lead Role (Male), and Best Performance in a Negative Role for Raja, Ravi, and Swami respectively. The film received thirteen nominations at the 9th Edison Awards, and won for Best Director, Best Actor, Best Character Actor (Ramaiah) and Best Villain. It garnered seven nominations at the 4th South Indian International Movie Awards ceremony, winning two awards, including Best Film and Best Actor (Critics). Among other wins, Thani Oruvan received one Ananda Vikatan Cinema Awards, Mirchi Music Awards South and Norway Tamil Film Festival Awards each.

Awards and nominations

See also 
 List of Tamil films of 2015

Notes

References

External links 
 Accolades for Thani Oruvan at the Internet Movie Database

Thani Oruvan